Edward Everest Dove (born April 4, 1937) is a former professional American football cornerback in the National Football League for the San Francisco 49ers and New York Giants.  He played college football at the University of Colorado and was drafted in the third round of the 1959 NFL Draft.

Dove served in the United States Army's XV Corps as a typist. Dove served two weeks out of the year for the XV Corps starting in 1959.

References

1937 births
Living people
American football cornerbacks
Colorado Buffaloes football players
New York Giants players
People from Boulder County, Colorado
San Francisco 49ers players
Western Conference Pro Bowl players